Tom Hendrickson (born 1 September 1994) is an English professional rugby union player for Premiership Rugby team Exeter Chiefs. He plays as a centre.

Hendrickson played on 30 March 2018 as Exeter beat Bath Rugby in the final of the Anglo-Welsh Cup. The previous season he had been a replacement in the Anglo-Welsh cup final but Exeter lost to Leicester Tigers on that occasion.

Hendrickson made his debut for the Chiefs in November 2013, featuring in a  LV= Cup win over Harlequins FC at Sandy Park and started for the first time with Exeter against  Ospreys a week later in the LV= Cup.

Personal life
Born in Nelson, New Zealand to a Kiwi father and Cornish mother  he was five when they came to Cornwall and at age seven began playing for the Cornish Pirates minis.

Honours
Anglo-Welsh Cup
Winners  2017-18
 
Runner-Up  2016-17

References

living people
1994 births
Exeter Chiefs players
Cornish Pirates players
Plymouth Albion R.F.C. players
New Zealand expatriate sportspeople in England